Andrew Lawrence Fortier (born July 14, 1987) is an American musician, guitarist, filmmaker, actor, and author. He is best known for his work with The Lucid; which he cofounded alongside Vinnie Dombroski (Sponge), David Ellefson (ex Megadeth), and Mike Heller (Fear Factory). He was guitarist for the now late Chuck Mosley (Faith No More). He has directed and edited the documentary Attack of Life: The Bang Tango Movie as well as the David Ellefson produced horror film Dwellers which Fortier also wrote and stars in. He is the author of Dark, Depressing, and Hilarious which is an autobiography on his career thus far.

Biography 
Fortier was born and raised on the southside of Chicago. He met hard rock band Bang Tango in June 2011 where they offered to let him shoot a studio documentary while they were in Chicago recording their album Pistol Whipped in the Bible Belt; Fortier agreed to the project which eventually grew from a studio documentary to a feature-length film about the band's career up to that point titled Attack of Life: The Bang Tango Movie. After completing the film, Fortier went on to join Bang Tango as second guitarist alongside Rowan Robertson.

After Bang Tango, Fortier joined Chuck Mosley's band as guitarist up until his passing in November 2017 which led to him writing a memoir about his experiences with Bang Tango and Mosley titled Dark, Depressing, and Hilarious.

As an actor, Fortier appears in the films Her Name Was Christa, Brimstone Incorporated, and Dwellers which he also wrote, directed, and edited.

In 2021 he cofounded The Lucid alongside Sponge vocalist Vinnie Dombroski, ex Megadeth bassist David Ellefson, and Fear Factory drummer Mike Heller. The band released their debut self titled album in fall 2021.

Film career

Attack of Life: The Bang Tango Movie 

Fortier took  4 years filming and editing what would become a documentary on 80's hard rock band Bang Tango. Originally intended as a studio documentary, the scope of the film grew once original members of the band became involved and more information was revealed regarding the band's history. The film was never given an official release due to clearance issues regarding usage of Bang Tango's back catalogue of music in the film which is owned by Universal Music.

Aside from the inclusion of various members of Bang Tango throughout the band's career up to that point, interviews featured throughout the film include: Howard Benson, Riki Rachtman, Chris DeMakes, Mandy Lion, Andrew Wilkow, Chip Z'Nuff, as well as an opening narration by Twisted Sister's Dee Snider.

The film had one free public screening in Fortier's hometown of Chicago, Illinois with Bang Tango in attendance in April 2015.

Fortier became a member of Bang Tango days later as the band's second guitarist.

Fortier released the film for free on YouTube in early 2016.

In June 2018, Fortier released an 11-minute deleted/extended scene from the film, which contained footage from being on the road with the band as well as more insight into how the band operates while on tour. Fortier made note that the footage was initially removed from the film due to its portrayal of the band members featured in the scenes.

Reception 
Reviews of the film were positive. The general consensus is that despite its low budget, the film still manages to get its point across in an unbiased, artistic, and engaging manner while being able to appeal to not only fans of the band or genre, but to anyone not familiar with Bang Tango.

Thanks. And Sorry: The Chuck Mosley Movie 
Summer 2017, Fortier was recruited as guitarist for (Ex-Faith No More frontman) Chuck Mosley's solo band. During his time with the band, Fortier and Mosley explored the idea of a potential documentary to where Mosley would be the subject. Prior to his passing in November 2017 Mosley confirmed with Fortier that a documentary about his life should be made. The film is being produced by Mosley's long time manager and percussionist, Douglas Esper.

In February 2018 it was announced that Thanks. And Sorry: The Chuck Mosley Movie was officially in production with a TBA release date.

Dwellers 

In May 2019, it was announced that Fortier will be writing, directing, and starring in the found footage horror film Dwellers which is being produced by Megadeth bassist David Ellefson and Thom Hazaert via their newly formed production company Ellefson Films. Along with Fortier, the film will also star James L. Edwards, Douglas Esper, Rick Jermain, and Jeff Hatrix. Ellefson and Hazaert will also be appearing in the film as featured cameos.

In August 2019, Ellefson Films released a 50-second teaser for the film which included a voice over from Canadian radio personality Mitch Lafon.

Ellefson Films hosted a Q&A panel at Rue Morgue's Frightmare in the Falls horror convention where Fortier and Ellefson revealed that the film will be a gritty found footage horror film that plays out as a documentary gone horribly wrong. Dwellers is described as being highly influenced by The Blair Witch Project and C.H.U.D.

The full trailer for Dwellers was released via Ellefson Films in November 2019.

Dwellers went on to be featured in various film festivals and won a selection of awards.

The film was released on Blu-ray/DVD/streaming October 12, 2021.

Other works 
As a way to hone his filmmaking skills to aid the process of creating and completing Attack of Life: The Bang Tango Movie, Fortier experimented with shooting and editing music videos for Bang Tango, which resulted in clips for their songs: Live Life, I Like It, Bring on the World, and Suck It Up from the Pistol Whipped in the Bible Belt album. This led to Fortier, through word of mouth, being hired to produce and edit promotional videos for such acts as: Vince Neil, Slaughter, Queensrÿche, Great White, Kix, Autograph, Lynch Mob, Vixen, Marty Casey, Les Warner, David Ellefson, Mark Slaughter, Jesse Camp, Doll Skin, A Killer's Confession, and more.

After completing Attack of Life: The Bang Tango Movie, Fortier was in talks with Fear Factory for a proposed documentary on the band's career. A treatment for the film was drafted which led to meeting with members of the band to speak further about the idea. It was ultimately decided that due to the band's ongoing litigation with former members, it was not the right time for a film to be made.

Music career

Bang Tango 

After completing and screening Attack of Life: The Bang Tango Movie in April 2015, Fortier would go on to join the film's subject, Bang Tango, as their second guitarist making his live debut with the band at the 2015 edition of the M3 Festival in Maryland. The decision to bring Fortier into the band was at the suggestion of Rowan Robertson who, as Bang Tango's lead guitarist, felt the band should be represented as having two guitarists to properly perform the material which was originally written and recorded with two guitarists.

Despite having Fortier become a member of the band, frontman Joe Leste' showed disdain toward Fortier in the press regarding the way Leste' had been portrayed in the film.

Fortier took a year long break performing with the band to work for Megadeth Bassist David Ellefson's EMP Label Group as their Operations Coordinator. Fortier worked closely with Ellefson and the label's Operations Director Thom Hazaert up until he returned to Bang Tango in August 2017.

Chuck Mosley 

Fortier joined Chuck Mosley's solo band early summer 2017. It was during this time that plans for a documentary on Mosley's life were discussed which would become Thanks. And Sorry: The Chuck Mosley Movie.

The Lucid 

In September 2021 it was revealed that a new band consisting of Sponge vocalist Vinnie Dombroski, ex-Megadeth bassist David Ellefson, Fear Factory drummer Mike Heller, and Fortier on guitar. The Lucid announced their debut single Maggot Wind along with an October 15 release date for their debut self titled album. The band released two more singles, "Damned" and "Hair", leading up to the release of their eponymous debut.

Other works 
In 2011, while shooting Attack of Life: The Bang Tango Movie and 4 years prior to joining the band, Fortier performed additional guitar and backing vocals on Bang Tango's Pistol Whipped in the Bible Belt album. His lead guitar parts can be heard in the choruses of the track Live Life, and his backing vocals can be heard in the choruses of the song Boombox Seance. In 2015, Fortier co-founded the supergroup Zen From Mars along with Chip Z'Nuff (Enuff Z'Nuff), Brynn Arens (Flipp), Mike Heller (Fear Factory), Stephen Shareaux (Kik Tracee), and Kate Catalina. As of 2021, their debut album has yet to be released. In June 2018, Fortier joined 90's hard rock band Flipp as their guitarist for a one-off show in Minnesota.

Acting career 
In 2017, Fortier made his acting debut in the horror film Her Name Was Christa, written by, directed by, and starring James L. Edwards who would go on to become a frequent collaborator of Fortier's.

Her Name Was Christa 

July 2017, Fortier was cast as a lead role in the Horror film Her Name Was Christa. Directed by, written, and starring James L. Edwards, the film was released in February 2020 to very polarized reviews.

Brimstone Incorporated 
In 2021, Fortier co-starred in the low budget horror anthology Brimstone Incorporated as Gregory Asmodeus, who is the main character of the film's wraparound story. Fortier was praised by critics for his work in the film with Horror Society opining that, "Fortier was phenomenal as the sleazy corporate goon over interviewing the recently deceased. I really loved the character and the energy he gave him." HorrorNews.net commented, "Drew Fortier did an amazing job as Gregory. You can tell he had a blast with the role and his performance is top-notch."

Trivial 
In fall of 2021, it was announced that Fortier would be starring in the revenge horror film Trivial along with Sasha Graham.

Writing career

Dark, Depressing, and Hilarious 
Fortier wrote an autobiography titled Dark, Depressing, and Hilarious which covers his career up until 2018.

Rock Star Hitman 
In November 2020 it was announced that Fortier along with Megadeth bassist David Ellefson had co-written a fiction thriller novel titled Rock Star Hitman released in December 2020 via The Ellefson Book Co.

Health 
In May 2022 it was revealed that Fortier had been diagnosed with Testicular cancer leading to him to have surgery removing his right testicle; as of June 2022, he is cancer free.

Filmography

Feature films

Acting roles

Music videos

Discography

With Bang Tango 
 Pistol Whipped in the Bible Belt (2012) - additional guitars and backing vocals

With Obszön Geschöpf 
 Master Of Giallo (2018) - guitar on the song "The Death Kiss"

With Ellefson 
No Cover (2020) - lead and rhythm guitar on cover of "Downed" by Cheap Trick

With The Lucid 
 The Lucid (2021)
 Saddle Up and Ride (2023)

Bibliography 

Dark, Depressing, and Hilarious: My Bittersweet Journey In and Out of the Music Business
2018 Hardcover 
2018 Paperback 
2018 Paperback (Amazon Edition) 
Rock Star Hitman
2020 Hardcover 
2020 Paperback

Accolades 
Fortier has received numerous awards internationally for the film Dwellers.

References

External links 

 
 
 
 

Living people
1987 births
American heavy metal guitarists
Alternative rock guitarists
American male guitarists
American male songwriters
American rock songwriters
Film directors from Illinois
Songwriters from Illinois
American actors
Actors from Illinois
American music video directors
American heavy metal musicians
21st-century American guitarists
Guitarists from Chicago
American funk guitarists
American film editors
American documentary film directors
Documentary film editors
Male actors from Chicago
American alternative rock musicians
American rock guitarists
Fingerstyle guitarists
Lead guitarists
Alternative metal musicians
Alternative metal guitarists
American autobiographers
21st-century American non-fiction writers
American male non-fiction writers
21st-century American male musicians
21st-century American male writers